Tanmanjeet Singh Dhesi (Punjabi: ਤਨਮਨਜੀਤ ਸਿੰਘ ਧੇਸੀ, born 17 August 1978) is a British Labour Party politician who has been the Member of Parliament (MP) for Slough since 2017. He was appointed Shadow Minister for the Railways by the Labour leader, Keir Starmer, in April 2020.

Personal life
Dhesi was born in Slough to Sikh Punjabi Indian parents, and spent his early years in Chalvey, Slough. He is the son of Jaspal Singh Dhesi, who runs a construction company in the UK, and the former president of Guru Nanak Darbar Gurdwara, in Gravesend, Kent - the largest gurdwara in the UK.

Dhesi received most of his primary education in the Punjab, India, before returning to the UK at the age of 9.

Dhesi has a bachelor's degree in mathematics with Management Studies from University College London, studied Applied Statistics at Keble College, Oxford, and has a Master of Philosophy in the History and Politics of South Asia from Fitzwilliam College, Cambridge.

Following in his father's footsteps, Mr Dhesi worked in construction for much of his life, running his own construction company in Scotland. He served as Director for Dhesi Construction Limited which became insolvent as records show on Companies House from July 2002 to January 2007 and DGP Logistics PLC from October 2005 to April 2011.

In 2012, his mother, Dalwinder Kaur Dhesi, was jailed in India, for kidnap and forcing an abortion on a teenage mother, who later died. The conviction was criticised by many commentators for being politically motivated, and an appeal was filed by Dalwinder in the immediate aftermath of the decision. In 2018, a double bench of the Punjab and Haryana High Court upheld this appeal. All charges against her were subsequently dropped.

Dhesi is familiar with eight languages and is fluent in Punjabi, Hindi, Urdu, French and English. He also has a working knowledge of German, Italian and Latin.

Early political career 
Dhesi was first elected as a councillor to Gravesham Borough Council in 2007. He later went on to become the Mayor of Gravesham between 2011 and 2012.

He has also served as Chair of Gravesham Constituency Labour Party in Kent, where he stood unsuccessfully during the 2015 general election, losing out to Conservative MP Adam Holloway.

Other voluntary roles whilst serving as a councillor include as school governor at two schools, a trustee with Alzheimer and Dementia Support Services, an advisor and member of Mencap and a member of the Independent Police Advisory Group to Kent Police.

Parliamentary career
He became Britain's first turbaned Sikh MP in the 2017 general election after gaining the nomination following Fiona Mactaggart standing down. He gave his maiden speech in the House of Commons on 18 July 2017 which was praised greatly by fellow MPs Gareth Snell and Mike Gapes.

Dhesi continued working as a Councillor for Kent County Council and as a consultant for DGP Logistics for almost 2 years after being elected as an MP.

Dhesi served on the Housing, Communities and Local Government Committee from July 2018 until the dissolution of the 57th Parliament of the United Kingdom on 6 November 2019.

In March 2020, Dhesi became a member of the Defence Select Committee. He stepped down from the committee in May 2020 following his appointment ⁹as Shadow Minister for Railways.

He supported Lisa Nandy in the 2020 Labour Party leadership election.

In 2021, Dhesi was accused of attempting to hire volunteers for long term work without pay with the job being posted on the Working For an MP website. It was claimed that the posting of the job was an administrative error and that Dhesi himself was unaware of its existence, however he declined to comment to the Huffington Post to confirm this.

Tan Dhesi has also been a guest on ex-UKIP leader Nigel Farage's show on GB News, despite Nigel Farage's hardline views on immigration and Slough's status as one of the most ethnic diverse towns within the United Kingdom.

References

External links
 

Living people
British politicians of Indian descent
Labour Party (UK) MPs for English constituencies
UK MPs 2017–2019
Alumni of University College London
Alumni of Fitzwilliam College, Cambridge
Mayors of places in Kent
Labour Party (UK) councillors
English Sikhs
1978 births
UK MPs 2019–present